Ryanggang Taep'yŏng station, originally P'yŏngmul station, is a former railway station in Taep'yŏng-rodongjagu, Poch'ŏn county, Ryanggang province, North Korea, the terminus of the narrow-gauge Poch'ŏn line.

History
The station, along with the rest of the Poch'ŏn Line, was opened by the Korean State Railway sometime after 1948. Extensive flooding in 1994 led to the closure of both the Poch'ŏn and Samjiyŏn lines, and the station has since been out of use.

References

Railway stations in North Korea